Kalle's Inn (Swedish:Kalle på Spången) is a 1939 Swedish comedy film directed by Emil A. Lingheim and starring Edvard Persson, Bullan Weijden and John Degerberg.

The film's sets were designed by the art director Max Linder.

Cast
 Edvard Persson as Kalle Jeppsson  
 Bullan Weijden as Berta Jeppsson  
 John Degerberg as Captain Sjölund  
 Carl Ström as Constable Högberg 
 Tord Bernheim as Gösta Högberg  
 Mim Persson as Stina  
 Anita Gyldtenungæ as Karin  
 Walter Sarmell as Mjölnar-Olle  
 Olga Hellqvist as Hortensia Kraft  
 Harry Persson as Oskar Olsson 
 Knut Borglin as Student Leader  
 Ingrid Buhre as Female Student 
 Alfhild Degerberg as En kvinna  
 Georg Funkquist as American

References

Bibliography 
 Mariah Larsson & Anders Marklund. Swedish Film: An Introduction and Reader. Nordic Academic Press, 2010.

External links 
 

1939 films
1939 comedy films
Swedish comedy films
1930s Swedish-language films
Films directed by Emil A. Lingheim
Swedish black-and-white films
1930s Swedish films